Mikhail Lutsenko (born 11 May 1948) is a Russian handball player. He competed in the men's tournament at the 1972 Summer Olympics.

References

1948 births
Living people
Russian male handball players
Olympic handball players of the Soviet Union
Handball players at the 1972 Summer Olympics
Sportspeople from Moscow